The Broadmeadow Basketball Stadium, also known as the Newcastle Basketball Stadium, is an indoor basketball stadium located in Newcastle, New South Wales, Australia and was the original home of the Newcastle Falcons of the National Basketball League from the origin of the league in 1979 until they  moved to the newly built Newcastle Entertainment Centre in 1992. The stadium is currently the home of the Newcastle Basketball Association and can hold approximately 2,200 spectators.

On 18 July 1982, the stadium hosted the 1982 NBL Grand Final where the West Adelaide Bearcats defeated the Geelong Supercats 80–74. The staging of an NBL game in Newcastle without the Falcons playing was possible due to the NBL's original policy of awarding the then single game Grand Final to a pre-determined venue regardless of the teams playing. The stadium also hosted the 1982 semi-finals with West Adelaide defeating the Coburg Giants 94–74 and Geelong defeating the Nunawading Spectres 101–59. Both semi-final games were played on 16 July. The Stadium later hosted the 2006 ABA National Finals.

On 15 August 2015, the Stadium hosted the LSU Tigers college basketball team in an exhibition game against the Newcastle All-Stars, which LSU won 89–75. A capacity crowd of almost 2,000, the biggest for a game at the Broadmeadow venue in more than 25 years, packed in to see the NBA-bound forward Ben Simmons compete for his new college team. A former Hunters junior, Simmons learnt to play basketball at Broadmeadow when his father, Dave, played and coached in Newcastle for the Falcons and the Hunter Pirates.

References

External links
1982 NBL Grand Final highlights

Defunct National Basketball League (Australia) venues
Basketball venues in Australia
Netball venues in New South Wales
Sport in Newcastle, New South Wales
Sports venues in New South Wales
Newcastle Falcons (basketball)
Sports venues completed in 1969
Buildings and structures in Newcastle, New South Wales